Nanorana quadranus (common names: Kwang-yang Asian frog, swelled vent frog) is a species of frog in the family Dicroglossidae. It is endemic to central China. Its natural habitats are temperate forest and shrubland, with breeding taking place in small rivers. It is a common species believed to be declining. It is threatened by collection for food and also habitat loss.

References

quadranus
Amphibians of China
Endemic fauna of China
Taxonomy articles created by Polbot
Amphibians described in 1960